The national flag of the People's Republic of China, also known as the Five-star Red Flag is a Chinese red field with five golden stars charged at the canton. The design features one large star, with four smaller stars in an arc set off towards the fly. It has been the national flag of China since the foundation of the People's Republic of China on 1 October 1949.

The red represents the Chinese Communist Revolution and the five stars and their relationships to each other represent the unity of the Chinese people under the leadership of the Chinese Communist Party (CCP). The flag was first hoisted by the People's Liberation Army (PLA) on a pole overlooking Beijing's Tiananmen Square on 1 October 1949, at a ceremony proclaiming the establishment of the People's Republic of China.

History

Early flags

The previous flag of China was the "Yellow Dragon Flag" used by the Qing dynasty — the last imperial dynasty in China's history — from 1865 until the overthrow of the monarchy during the Xinhai Revolution. The flag that was adopted in 1867 was triangular, but the dynasty adopted a rectangular version of the dragon flag in 1889.

Republic of China

The canton (upper corner on the hoist side) originated from the "Blue Sky with a White Sun flag" designed by Lu Haodong, a martyr of the Xinhai Revolution. He presented his design to represent the revolutionary army at the inauguration of the Society for Regenerating China, an anti-Qing society in Hong Kong, on 21 February 1895. This design was later adopted as the KMT party flag and the Coat of Arms of the Republic of China. The "red Earth" portion was added by Sun Yat-sen in the winter of 1906, bringing the flag to its modern form. According to George Yeo, the then Foreign Minister of Singapore in 2011, in those days, the Blue Sky with a White Sun flag was sewn in the Sun Yat Sen Nanyang Memorial Hall (formerly known as the "Sun Yat Sen Villa") in Singapore by Teo Eng Hock and his wife. The drafted design had ten stripes with the flag of the Kuomintang in the canton that resembled the flags of the United States, Malaysia, and Liberia.

During the Wuchang Uprising in 1911 that heralded the Republic, the various revolutionary armies had different flags. Lu Hao-tung's "Blue Sky with a White Sun" flag was used in the provinces of Guangdong, Guangxi, Yunnan, and Guizhou. In Wuhan, a flag with 18 yellow stars was used to represent the 18 administrative divisions at the time. In Shanghai and northern China, a "Five-Colored Flag" (Five Races Under One Union flag) was used of five horizontal stripes representing the five major nationalities of China: the Han (red), the Manchu (yellow), the Mongol (blue), the Hui (white), and the Tibetan (black).

When the government of the Republic of China was established on 1 January 1912, the "Five-Colored Flag" was selected by the provisional Senate as the national flag. The "18-Star Flag" was adopted by the army and the modern flag was adopted as a naval ensign. Sun Yat-sen, however, did not consider the five-colored flag appropriate, reasoning that horizontal order implied a hierarchy or class like that which existed during dynastic times.

After President Yuan Shikai assumed dictatorial powers in 1913 by dissolving the National Assembly and outlawing the KMT, Sun Yat-sen established a government-in-exile in Tokyo and employed the modern flag as the national ROC flag. He continued using this design when the KMT established a rival government in Guangzhou in 1917. The modern flag was made the official national flag on 17 December 1928 after the successful Northern Expedition that overthrew the Beijing government, though the Five-Colored Flag still continued to be used by locals in an unofficial capacity. One reason for this discrepancy in use was lingering regional biases held by officials and citizens of northern China, who favored the Five-Colored Flag, against southerners such as the Cantonese/Hakka Sun Yat-sen.

During the Second Sino-Japanese War, the invading Japanese established a variety of puppet governments using several flag designs. The "Reform Government", established in March 1938 in Nanjing to consolidate the various puppet governments, employed the Five-Colored Flag. When Wang Jingwei was slated to take over the Japanese-installed government in Nanjing in 1940, he demanded to use the modern flag as a means to challenge the authority of the Nationalist Government in Chongqing under Chiang Kai-shek and position himself as the rightful successor to Sun Yat-sen. However, the Japanese preferred the Five-Colored flag. As a compromise, the Japanese suggested adding a triangular yellow pennant on top with the slogan "Peace, Anticommunism, National Construction" in black, but this was rejected by Wang. In the end, Wang and the Japanese agreed that the yellow banner was to be used outdoors only until 1943, when the banner was abandoned, leaving two rival governments with the same flag, each claiming to be the legitimate national government of China.

The flag was specified in Article Six of the 1947 Constitution. During the Chinese Civil War (prior to October 1949), the flag system under CCP rule in China was very confusing - institutionally, the rival old government flag was recognized as a legitimate national flag, but was not encouraged to be flown. Communist forces and supporters tended to use the CCP flag, the red flag without a design, the army merit flag, and the official military flag that came later. In addition, some regions use the Soviet national flag as a substitute, a practice that is severely reprimanded in official CCP documents.After the Chinese Civil War in 1949, the ROC government led by Chiang Kai-shek relocated its government and its institutions to the island of Taiwan. On the mainland, CCP forces of Mao Zedong established the People's Republic of China (PRC) and adopted their own national flag. On 23 October 1954, the National Emblem and National Flag of the Republic of China Act was promulgated by the Legislative Yuan to specify the size, measure, ratio, production, and management of the flag.

People's Republic of China

On 4 July 1949, the sixth working group of the Preparatory Committee of the New Political Consultative Conference (PCNPCC) created a notice to submit designs for the national flag. After subsequent revisions, the notice was published in the papers People's Daily, Beiping Liberation News, Xinmin News, Dazhong Daily, Guangming Daily, Jinbu Daily and Tianjin Daily during the period 15–26 July. The list of requirements for the national flag were also posted in the notice:
 Chinese characteristics (geography, nationality, history, culture, etc.);
 Power characteristics (people's democratic government, led by the working class and based on the worker-peasant alliance);
 The shape should be rectangular and the length-breadth ratio should be 3:2;
 The color should mainly be bright red (an early draft of the notice had the color as dark red, but this was changed to bright red by Zhou Enlai).

Zeng Liansong, a citizen from Wenzhou, Zhejiang, was working in Shanghai when the announcement came out; he wanted to create a flag design to express his patriotic enthusiasm for the new country. In the middle of July, he sat down in his attic over the course of several nights to come up with designs. His inspiration for the current design came from observing how stars shine in the night sky. He thusly thought of a Chinese proverb, "longing for the stars, longing for the moon" (pàn xīngxīng pàn yuèliàng), which shows yearning. He viewed the CCP as the great savior (dà jiùxīng "great saving star") of the Chinese people, symbolized by the flag's largest star. The idea for four small stars came from "On the People's Democratic Dictatorship", a speech by Mao Zedong, which defined the Chinese people as consisting of four social classes, also traditionally referred to in Asian cultures as the four occupations (shì nóng gōng shāng) ("Scholars, Peasants, Workers, Merchants"). The color yellow implies that China belongs to the Chinese people, a "yellow race". After working out the details of the placement of the stars and their sizes (he had tried to put all of the stars in the center, but thought this too dull), he sent his "Five Stars on a Field of Red" (hóng dì wǔxīng qí) design to the committee in the middle of August.

By 20 August, between 2,992 and 3,012 designs had been sent to the flag committee, including input from committee members themselves such as Guo Moruo and Tan Kah Kee. From 16 to 20 August, the designs were viewed at the Beijing Hotel and culled down to a list of 38. These designs are collected into a book named A Reference of National Flag Designs. This book was then submitted to the newly established Chinese People's Political Consultative Conference (CPPCC) for further discussion. However, Zeng's design was not included until Tian Han nominated it again.

On the morning of 23 September, the representatives of the CPPCC discussed the national flags, but came to no conclusion. Some disliked the symbolism which Zeng attached to the four smaller stars, and said it should not include the bourgeoisie. The design Mao and others liked had a giant golden star in the corner on a red flag that was charged with a golden horizontal bar. But this design was strongly opposed by Zhang Zhizhong, who saw the golden bar as symbolizing China being divided into two. That night, Peng Guanghan recommended Zeng's design to Zhou Enlai. Zhou was satisfied with it and asked for the creation of a larger copy of the design. Tan Kah Kee also gave his advice to Mao and Zhou that the power characteristics take precedence over Chinese geography characteristics, so there was no need to insist on the golden bar that symbolized the Yellow River. Two days later, Mao had a meeting in his office about the flag. He persuaded everyone to adopt Zeng's design, with some slight modifications. According to earlier discussions at the Beijing Hotel, the hammer and sickle from Zeng's original design was removed since it was similar to the Flag of the Soviet Union. On 27 September 1949, Zeng's modified design was selected unanimously by the First Plenary Session of CPPCC, which changed the flag's name to "Five-star Red Flag".

On 29 September, the new flag was published in the People's Daily, so the design could be copied by other local authorities. The flag was officially unveiled and raised for the first time by Mao Zedong in Beijing's Tiananmen Square on 1 October 1949, at the formal announcement of the People's Republic of China. The first flag flown over Tiananmen Square was sewn together by Zhao Wenrui, a seamstress who finished the task around 1pm on 30 September. Zeng had a hard time believing that his design was picked, due to the missing hammer and sickle from the giant star. However, he was officially congratulated by the General Office of the Central People's Government as the designer of the flag and received 5 million yuan for his work.

Symbolism 

According to the official government interpretation of the flag, the red background symbolizes the Chinese Communist Revolution. The five stars and their relationship represents the unity of Chinese people under the leadership of the CCP. The orientation of the stars shows that the unity should revolve around a center. The larger star symbolizes the CCP, and the four smaller stars that surround the big star symbolize the four social classes of China's New Democracy mentioned in Mao's "On the People's Democratic Dictatorship": the working class, the peasantry, the urban petite bourgeoisie, and the national bourgeoisie. It is sometimes stated that the five stars of the flag represent the five largest ethnic groups: Han Chinese, Zhuangs, Hui people, Manchus and Uyghurs. This is generally regarded as an erroneous conflation with the "Five Races Under One Union" flag, used 1912–28 by the Beiyang Government of Republic of China, whose different-colored stripes represented the Han Chinese, Hui people, Manchus, Mongols and Tibetans.

Flag desecration is prohibited in China. The penal code provides for imprisonment up to three years, criminal detention, public surveillance, or deprivation of political rights for "whoever desecrates the National Flag or the National Emblem of the People's Republic of China by intentionally burning, mutilating, scrawling on, defiling or trampling upon it in a public place". Some Taiwanese groups have burned the Chinese flag in protest of the PRC government.

Construction details, sizes and colors 
The construction sheet for the national flag was published on 28 September 1949 by an order from the Presidium of the First Plenary Session of the CPPCC. The information can also be found in the document "GB 12982-2004: National flag" that was released by the Standardization Administration of China. 

During the 2016 Summer Olympics in Rio de Janeiro, flags that failed to adhere to the regulations were used in connection with China. The flags, used during the opening ceremony and two medal ceremonies, featured the four small stars incorrectly angled in the same direction, eliciting both fury at and a subsequent apology from the Olympic organizers.

The  mentions five possible sizes that could be made for the national flag: According to Article 4 of the Law On the National Flag, people's governments of provinces, autonomous regions and municipalities directly under the Central Government are directed to authorize companies to make any copy of the national flag. Besides five official sizes for flying on flagpoles, there are another four smaller sizes for other purposes, such as decoration on cars or display in meeting rooms.

Colors 
The colors of the national flag are stipulated in the document "GB 12983-2004: Standard Color Sample of the National Flag", and promulgated by the Standardization Administration of China. The colors are in specified in CIE 1964 xyY10 color space under standard illuminant D65.

For computer display, the National Flag Law defers to "standard" PNG images posted on the National People's Congress website. The specific colors used, in the sRGB space of the PNG file, are:

Unicode

Regulations 

The current law about the national flag was passed by 14th Meeting of the Standing Committee of the Seventh National People's Congress on 28 June 1990 and was enforced starting 1 October 1990. The main point of the law was to set down regulations on how to make the Chinese flag, what it looks like, where it can be flown and how it can be flown. The law also stresses that the national flag is "the symbol and hallmark of the People's Republic of China" and that everyone "shall respect and care for the National Flag".

Guidelines for Display of the Flag 
The National Flag Law of the People's Republic of China has made detailed regulations on places or institutions for raising the national flag. The flag should be hung at various departments of the State Council, the standing committees of local people's congresses at all levels, courts, and local committees of the Chinese People's Political Consultative Conference or property belonging to said places or institutions on working days. National flags should be raised in full-time schools except on vacations and Sundays.

Priority in processions
However, incidents violating the aforementioned provisions, such as the CCP flag leading the national flag, have occurred.

Folding the flag
 Fold horizontally along the center.
 Repeat, fold horizontally along the center.
 Fold vertically along the center of the flag.
 Repeat, fold vertically along the center of the flag.
 Repeat, fold vertically along the center of the flag.
 Repeat, fold vertically along the top

Desecration

Flag desecration is prohibited in China. The penal code provides for imprisonment up to three years, criminal detention, public surveillance, or deprivation of political rights for "whoever desecrates the National Flag or the National Emblem of the People's Republic of China by intentionally burning, mutilating, scrawling on, defiling or trampling upon it in a public place".

On 29 September 2017, Hong Kong elected legislator Cheng Chung-tai was convicted of desecrating the flag under the National Flag and National Emblem Ordinance.  He had been seen turning representations of the flags (not of standard dimensions) upside down in the legislative chamber in October of the previous year.

Flags of the Special Administrative Regions of the People's Republic of China

Due to an order passed by the CCP Central Committee General Office and General Office of the State Council, cities and provinces are no longer allowed to adopt their own symbols. However, both of the Hong Kong and Macau Special Administrative Regions of China have their own special flags. The precise use of the SAR flags are regulated by laws passed by the National People's Congress.

The Flag of the Hong Kong Special Administrative Region features a stylized, white, five-petal Bauhinia blakeana flower in the center of a red field. On each petal is a red star; the stars demonstrate Hong Kong residents' love of their motherland, while the overall flag design signifies the reestablished link between postcolonial Hong Kong and China while demonstrating the "One country, two systems" political principle applied to the region. The flag of Hong Kong was adopted on 16 February 1990. On 10 August 1996, it received formal approval from the Preparatory Committee, a group which advised the People's Republic of China (PRC) on Hong Kong's transfer of sovereignty from the United Kingdom to the PRC in 1997. The flag was first officially hoisted on 1 July 1997, in the handover ceremony marking the transfer of sovereignty from the United Kingdom to China.

The Regional flag of the Macau Special Administrative Region is "Macau green" with a lotus flower above a stylized image of the Governor Nobre de Carvalho Bridge and water in white, beneath an arc of five gold, five-pointed stars: one large star in the center of the arc and four smaller ones. The lotus was chosen as the floral emblem of Macau. The Governor Nobre de Carvalho Bridge is a bridge linking the Macau Peninsula and the island of Taipa. The bridge is one of the most recognizable landmarks of the territory. The water beneath the lotus and the bridge symbolize Macau's position as a port and its role played in the territory. The five five-pointed stars echo the design of the national flag, symbolizing the relationship Macau has with its mother country. The design was chosen on 15 January 1993 by a committee that was drafting the Basic Law for the Macau SAR and was formally adopted by the Macau SAR Preparatory Committee on 16 January 1999. The flag was first officially hoisted on 20 December 1999, in the handover ceremony marking the transfer of sovereignty from Portugal to China.

Military flags 

There are six flags that are used by the People's Liberation Army (PLA). The main feature of these flags is a golden star at the top left corner and two Chinese characters "" to the right of the star, all placed on a red background. The characters "" (literally "eight one") pay homage to the events on 1 August 1927 (8th month, 1st day); this was when the PLA was created by the CCP to start their rebellion against the Kuomintang Government in Nanchang. The main flag of the PLA was created on 15 June 1949 by a decree issued from Mao. For ceremonies, a PLA flag with golden fringe is placed on a pole with gold and red spiral stripes and topped with a golden finial and red tassel. Each branch of the PLA, the Ground Forces, Navy, Air Force and Rocket Force, also have their own flags to use. In a 1992 order, the flags of the three branches were defined. The top  of the flags is the same as the PLA flag; the bottom  are occupied by the colors of the branches. The flag of the Ground Forces has a forest green bar at the bottom, the naval ensign has stripes of blue and white at the bottom, the Air Force uses a sky blue bar and the Rocket Force uses a yellow bar at the bottom. The forest green represents the earth, the blue and white stripes represent the seas, the sky blue represents the air and the yellow represents the flare of missile launching.

CCP flags 

After the CCP was founded in 1920, various sections of the party made flags based on what the Bolsheviks used, producing various designs and patterns. The current flag of the CCP was not created until 28 April 1942. On that date, the CCP Central Committee Political Bureau issued a decree announcing the flag and the pattern it should follow. The design was further defined in the CCP Constitution in 1996. The flag has a red background that is charged with the emblem of the CCP in gold at the top left corner. The flag ratio is defined as two by three (24×36 units); the size of the emblem is eight units square, placed four units away from the hoist and three units away from the top of the flag.

The flag of the Communist Youth League of China was adopted on 4 May 1950.  The design of the flag consists of the group emblem, a gold star surrounded by a ring of gold, charged on a red field. The construction of the flag consists of making the top hoist portion of the flag into twelve by eighteen units, placing the emblem in the middle of that rectangle. The radius of the emblem is four units.

The Young Pioneers of China currently uses two flags. The first flag is for pioneer battalions. A golden badge of the Young Pioneers is placed in the center of the flag. However, for a company, a second, modified flag is used. A  triangle is cut out of the fly edge of the flag and the golden emblem is shifted closer towards the hoist.

Customs flag

The customs flag is the Chinese national flag with the emblem of customs at the lower right corner, which consists of a golden key and the Caduceus of Hermes, crossing each other. The current customs flag was officially adopted on 1 October 1953. The customs flag should be hung at the bow of the customs vessel.

Historical flags/Foreign-involved flags

Gallery

See also 

 List of Chinese flags
 Emblem of the People's Republic of China
 March of the Volunteers
 Flag of the Republic of China
 Red flag

Notes

References

External links 
 
 
 

National symbols of the People's Republic of China
China
China
 
China
Flags of Asia